Events in the year 1927 in India.

Incumbents
 Emperor of India – George V
 Viceroy of India – The Lord Irwin

Events
 National income - 32,890 million
 18 January – Council House in New Delhi is opened.
 14 April - The first formal meeting of Haj Committee of India held at Bombay.
 28 September – Fatal communal riots in Dehra Dun, U.P.
 12 November – Mahatma Gandhi made his first and last visit to Ceylon.
 The Simon Commission is formed to consider further steps toward self-rule of India. No Indian member is included.
 Dr. B.R. Ambedkar started temple entry movement in 1927.

Law
Indian Forest Act
Light House Act

Births
 24 January – J. Om Prakash, film producer. (died 2019)
 30 January – Bendapudi Venkata Satyanarayana, dermatologist (died 2005)
 3 February -  Vasant Sarwate, cartoonist and writer (died 2016)
 28 February – Krishan Kant, politician, Vice President of India (died 2002)
 3 June – M. Narasimham, Governor of the Reserve Bank of India (died 2021)
 1 July – Chandra Shekhar, politician, 8th Prime Minister of India (died 2007)
 3 July – Balivada Kantha Rao, novelist and playwright (died 2000)
 12 July – Muhammad Iqbal, Pakistani hammer thrower
 20 July – Rajendra Kumar, actor and producer (died 1999).
 26 August – Bansi Lal, Haryana's four time chief minister, and defence minister of India during Indian Emergency (1975–77) (died 2006)
 8 November – Lal Krishna Advani, politician and former Deputy Prime Minister of India
 25 December – Ram Narayan, sarangi player

Full date unknown
 Adoor Bhasi, actor, writer, journalist, singer and film producer (died 1990)
 K. T. Muhammed, playwright (died 2008)

Deaths

 19 December – Ashfaqulla Khan, freedom fighter
 19 December – Ram Prasad Bismil, freedom fighter

References

 
India
Years of the 20th century in India